Pratap Dhavala  was Khayaravala king in 12th century. There are  inscription of Pratapdhavala in Phulwaria, Tutrahi fall rock inscription of Vikram Samvat 1214, Tarachandi rock inscription of Vikram Samvat 1225.

References

12th-century Indian monarchs